Vasas Femina Fotbal Club, commonly known as Vasas Femina, or simply Vasas, is a Romanian women's football club based in Odorheiu Secuiesc, Harghita County, Romania. The team was founded on 18 July 2012 and since then playing constantly in the Romanian leagues.

Vasas Femina currently plays in the Liga I, first tier of the Romanian women's football system, after ranking 2nd at the end of the 2017–18 season.

Honours

Leagues
Liga I
Runners-up (1): 2017–18
Liga II
Runners-up (2): 2013–14, 2014–15

Cups
Romanian Women's Cup
Winners (1): 2018–19

Season by season

Current squad
.

}

Club officials

Board of directors

 Last updated: 19 January 2019
 Source: Board of directors

Current technical staff

 Last updated: 19 January 2019
 Source: Technical staff

References

External links
 

Women's football clubs in Romania
Football clubs in Harghita County
Association football clubs established in 2012
2012 establishments in Romania